Miranda, also designated Uranus V, is the smallest and innermost of Uranus's five round satellites. It was discovered by Gerard Kuiper on 16 February 1948 at McDonald Observatory in Texas, and named after Miranda from William Shakespeare's play The Tempest. Like the other large moons of Uranus, Miranda orbits close to its planet's equatorial plane. Because Uranus orbits the Sun on its side, Miranda's orbit is perpendicular to the ecliptic and shares Uranus' extreme seasonal cycle.

At just 470 km in diameter, Miranda is one of the smallest closely observed objects in the Solar System that might be in hydrostatic equilibrium (spherical under its own gravity). The only close-up images of Miranda are from the Voyager 2 probe, which made observations of Miranda during its Uranus flyby in January 1986. During the flyby, Miranda's southern hemisphere pointed towards the Sun, so only that part was studied.

Miranda probably formed from an accretion disc that surrounded the planet shortly after its formation, and, like other large moons, it is likely differentiated, with an inner core of rock surrounded by a mantle of ice. Miranda has one of the most extreme and varied topographies of any object in the Solar System, including Verona Rupes, a 20-kilometer-high scarp that is the highest cliff in the Solar System, and chevron-shaped tectonic features called coronae. The origin and evolution of this varied geology, the most of any Uranian satellite, are still not fully understood, and multiple hypotheses exist regarding Miranda's evolution.

Discovery and name 
Miranda was discovered on 16 February 1948 by planetary astronomer Gerard Kuiper using the McDonald Observatory's  Otto Struve Telescope. Its motion around Uranus was confirmed on 1 March 1948. It was the first satellite of Uranus discovered in nearly 100 years. Kuiper elected to name the object "Miranda" after the character in Shakespeare's The Tempest, because the four previously discovered moons of Uranus, Ariel, Umbriel, Titania and Oberon, had all been named after characters of Shakespeare or Alexander Pope. However, the previous moons had been named specifically after fairies, whereas Miranda was a human. Subsequently, discovered satellites of Uranus were named after characters from Shakespeare and Pope, whether fairies or not. The moon is also designated Uranus V.

Orbit 
Of Uranus's five round satellites, Miranda orbits closest to it, at roughly 129,000 km from the surface; about a quarter again as far as its most distant ring. Its orbital period is 34 hours, and, like that of the Moon, is synchronous with its rotation period, which means it always shows the same face to Uranus, a condition known as tidal locking. Miranda's orbital inclination (4.34°) is unusually high for a body so close to its planet – roughly ten times that of the other major Uranian satellites, and 73 times that of Oberon. The reason for this is still uncertain; there are no mean-motion resonances between the moons that could explain it, leading to the hypothesis that the moons occasionally pass through secondary resonances, which at some point in the past led to Miranda being locked for a time into a 3:1 resonance with Umbriel, before chaotic behaviour induced by the secondary resonances moved it out of it again. In the Uranian system, due to the planet's lesser degree of oblateness and the larger relative size of its satellites, escape from a mean-motion resonance is much easier than for satellites of Jupiter or Saturn.

Composition and internal structure 

At 1.2 g/cm3, Miranda is the least dense of Uranus's round satellites. That density suggests a composition of more than 60% water ice. Miranda's surface may be mostly water ice, though it is far rockier than its corresponding satellites in the Saturn system, indicating that heat from radioactive decay may have led to internal differentiation, allowing silicate rock and organic compounds to settle in its interior. Miranda is too small for any internal heat to have been retained over the age of the Solar System. Miranda is the least spherical of Uranus's satellites, with an equatorial diameter 3% wider than its polar diameter. Only water has been detected so far on Miranda's surface, though it has been speculated that methane, ammonia, carbon monoxide or nitrogen may also exist at 3% concentrations. These bulk properties are similar to Saturn's moon Mimas, though Mimas is smaller, less dense, and more oblate.

Precisely how a body as small as Miranda could have enough internal energy to produce the myriad geological features seen on its surface is not established with certainty, though the currently favoured hypothesis is that it was driven by tidal heating during a past time when it was in 3:1 orbital resonance with Umbriel. The resonance would have increased Miranda's orbital eccentricity to 0.1, and generated tidal friction due to the varying tidal forces from Uranus. As Miranda approached Uranus, tidal force increased; as it retreated, tidal force decreased, causing flexing that would have warmed Miranda's interior by 20 K, enough to trigger melting. The period of tidal flexing could have lasted for up to 100 million years. Also, if clathrate existed within Miranda, as has been hypothesised for the satellites of Uranus, it may have acted as an insulator, since it has a lower conductivity than water, increasing Miranda's temperature still further. Miranda may have also once been in a 5:3 orbital resonance with Ariel, which would have also contributed to its internal heating. However, the maximum heating attributable to the resonance with Umbriel was likely about three times greater.

Surface features 

Due to Uranus's near-sideways orientation, only Miranda's southern hemisphere was visible to Voyager 2 when it arrived. The observed surface has patchwork regions of broken terrain, indicating intense geological activity in Miranda's past, and is criss-crossed by huge canyons, believed to be the result of extensional tectonics; as liquid water froze beneath the surface, it expanded, causing the surface ice to split, creating graben. The canyons are hundreds of kilometers long and tens of kilometers wide. Some of Miranda's terrain is possibly less than 100 million years old based on crater counts, while sizeable regions possess crater counts that indicate ancient terrain.

While crater counts suggest that the majority of Miranda's surface is old, with a similar geological history to the other Uranian satellites, few of those craters are particularly large, indicating that most must have formed after a major resurfacing event in its distant past. Craters on Miranda also appear to possess softened edges, which could be the result either of ejecta or of cryovolcanism. The temperature at Miranda's south pole is roughly 85 K, a temperature at which pure water ice adopts the properties of rock. Also, the cryovolcanic material responsible for the surfacing is too viscous to have been pure liquid water, but too fluid to have been solid water.

Inverness is lower in altitude than the surrounding terrain (though domes and ridges are of comparable elevation), while Elsinore is higher. The relative sparsity of craters on their surfaces means they overlay the earlier cratered terrain. The coronae, which are unique to Miranda, initially defied easy explanation; one early hypothesis was that Miranda, at some time in its distant past, (prior to any of the current cratering) had been completely torn to pieces, perhaps by a massive impact, and then reassembled in a random jumble. The heavier core material fell through the crust, and the coronae formed as the water re-froze.

However, the current favoured hypothesis is that they formed via extensional processes at the tops of diapirs, or upwellings of warm ice from within Miranda itself. The coronae are surrounded by rings of concentric faults with a similar low-crater count, suggesting they played a role in their formation. If the coronae formed through downwelling from a catastrophic disruption, then the concentric faults would present as compressed. If they formed through upwelling, such as by diapirism, then they would be extensional tilt blocks, and present extensional features, as current evidence suggests they do. The concentric rings would have formed as ice moved away from the heat source. The diapirs may have changed the density distribution within Miranda, which could have caused Miranda to reorient itself, similar to a process believed to have occurred at Saturn's geologically active moon Enceladus. Evidence suggests the reorientation would have been as extreme as 60 degrees from the sub-Uranian point. The positions of all the coronae require a tidal heating pattern consistent with Miranda being solid, and lacking an internal liquid ocean. It is believed through computer modelling that Miranda may have an additional corona on the unimaged hemisphere.

Observation and exploration 

Miranda's apparent magnitude is +16.6, making it invisible to many amateur telescopes. Virtually all known information regarding its geology and geography was obtained during the flyby of Uranus made by Voyager 2 on 25 January 1986, The closest approach of Voyager 2 to Miranda was —significantly less than the distances to all other Uranian moons. Of all the Uranian satellites, Miranda had the most visible surface. The discovery team had expected Miranda to resemble Mimas, and found themselves at a loss to explain the moon's unique geography in the 24-hour window before releasing the images to the press. In 2017, as part of its Planetary Science Decadal Survey, NASA evaluated the possibility of an orbiter to return to Uranus some time in the 2020s. Uranus was the preferred destination over Neptune due to favourable planetary alignments meaning shorter flight times.

See also 
 List of geological features on Miranda

References

External links 

 Miranda Profile at NASA's Solar System Exploration site
 Miranda page at The Nine Planets
 Miranda, a Moon of Uranus at Views of the Solar System
 Paul Schenk's 3D images and flyover videos of Miranda and other outer solar system satellites
 Miranda Nomenclature from the USGS Planetary Nomenclature web site

 
19480216
Discoveries by Gerard Kuiper
Things named after Shakespearean works
Moons with a prograde orbit
The Tempest